The 1931 U.S. Open was the 35th U.S. Open, held July 2–6 at Inverness Club in Toledo, Ohio. Billy Burke won his only major title, defeating George Von Elm in a marathon 72-hole playoff, the longest in tournament history.

Von Elm, the 1926 U.S. Amateur champion, held the 54-hole lead at 217 after rounds of 75-69-73. Burke, playing just ahead of Von Elm in the final round, carded a 73 and a 292 total. Von Elm bogeyed 12, 14, 15, and 16, and needed a birdie at 18 to force a 36-hole playoff on Sunday.

In the playoff, Von Elm and Burke were still tied after 36 holes, with Von Elm making a birdie on the 36th to extend it. In the era prior to sudden-death, 36-hole playoffs were required to break ties, so another was held the following day.

In the morning round, Von Elm shot a 76 and led by a stroke, but Burke took the lead late in the afternoon round at the 32nd and extended it to two strokes at the 34th. A bogey on the final hole narrowed Burke's victory margin to one stroke, 148 to Von Elm's 149. Burke reportedly smoked 32 cigars during the tournament, and quipped afterwards: "George Von Elm lost . I gained three."

Following this tournament, the USGA reduced the length of all future playoffs to 18 holes, which remained the format until 2018. A second playoff round was played in 1939 and 1946. Sudden-death after 18 holes was added in the 1950s, but was not needed until 1990, and was used again 1994 and 2008.

Leo Diegel made a hole-in-one during the second round, only the third in U.S. Open history and first since 1922. He missed the playoff by two strokes and finished in third place. Low-amateur went to Philip Perkins, who finished in a tie for seventh. Three-time British Open champion Henry Cotton played the first of two U.S. Open appearances this year, missing the cut. Defending champion Bobby Jones retired from competition in 1930 and did not compete.

This was the second U.S. Open at Inverness, which hosted eleven years earlier in 1920. It later hosted in 1957 and 1979, and the PGA Championship in 1986 and 1993.

Course layout

Source:

Past champions in the field 

Source:

 All former champions in the field made the cut

Round summaries

First round
Thursday, July 2, 1931

Source:

Second round
Friday, July 3, 1931

Source:

Third round
Saturday, July 4, 1931 (morning)

Source:

Final round
Saturday, July 4, 1931 (afternoon)

(a) denotes amateur
Source:

Scorecard
Final round

Cumulative tournament scores, relative to par
{|class="wikitable" span = 50 style="font-size:85%;
|-
|style="background: Pink;" width=10|
|Birdie
|style="background: PaleGreen;" width=10|
|Bogey
|}
Source:

Playoff

First playoff
Sunday, July 5, 1931

Source:

Scorecards
Morning round

Afternoon round

Cumulative playoff scores, relative to par
{|class="wikitable" span = 50 style="font-size:85%;
|-
|style="background: Pink;" width=10|
|Birdie
|style="background: PaleGreen;" width=10|
|Bogey
|style="background: Green;" width=10|
|Double bogey
|}
Source:

Second playoff
Monday, July 6, 1931

 Playoff bonus is included: $750 to champion, $250 to runner-up

Scorecards
Morning round

Afternoon round

Source:

References

External links
USGA Championship Database
USOpen.com - 1931

U.S. Open (golf)
Golf in Ohio
Sports in Toledo, Ohio
U.S. Open
U.S. Open
U.S. Open
Sports competitions in Ohio
July 1931 sports events